The Tunnel (German: Der Tunnel) is a 1933 French-German science fiction film directed by Curtis Bernhardt and starring Paul Hartmann, Attila Hörbiger and Olly von Flint. The film was made by Bavaria Film, and shot at the company's Emelka Studios in Munich. It is an adaptation of Bernhard Kellermann's 1913 novel Der Tunnel about the construction of a vast tunnel under the Atlantic Ocean connecting Europe and America. It premiered at the Capitol Theatre in November 1933.

A separate French version was also produced. In 1935 the film was remade in Britain with the same title. The 1935 British film was released in the United States as Transatlantic Tunnel.

Cast 
 Paul Hartmann as Mac Allen 
 Attila Hörbiger as Hobby 
 Olly von Flint as Mary Allen 
 Gustaf Gründgens as Mr. Woolf, tunnel syndicate director
 Otto Wernicke as Bärmann 
 Max Weydner as Mr. Lloyd, financier 
 Elga Brink as Ethel Lloyd 
 Richard Ryen as Gordon 
 Georg Henrich as Vandrstyfft 
 Max Schreck as Chesterfield 
 Magda Lena as Miss Brown 
 Will Dohm as Brooce 
 Ferdinand Marian as The Agitator 
 Josef Eichheim as Harris, a journalist 
 Günther Vogdt 
 Erna Fentsch 
 Beppo Brem 
 Otto Brüggemann
 Friedrich Ulmer

References

Bibliography 
 Koepnick, Lutz. The Dark Mirror: German Cinema Between Hitler and Hollywood. University of California Press, 2002.

External links 
 

1933 films
Films of the Weimar Republic
French science fiction films
German science fiction films
French black-and-white films
1930s science fiction films
1930s German-language films
Films directed by Curtis Bernhardt
Films based on German novels
Films based on works by Bernhard Kellermann
German multilingual films
German black-and-white films
1933 multilingual films
1930s French films
1930s German films